Helvi Koskinen (née Vahvelainen; 7 January 1930, in Vahviala  7 January 1990) was a Finnish politician. She was a member of the Parliament of Finland from 1983 to 1987, representing the Finnish Rural Party (SMP).

References

1930 births
1990 deaths
People from Vyborg District
Finnish Rural Party politicians
Members of the Parliament of Finland (1983–87)